Wilhelm Guddorf (alias Paul Braun; 20 February 1902 – 13 May 1943) was a Belgian journalist, anti-Nazi and resistance fighter against the Third Reich. Guddorf was a leading member of a Berlin anti-fascist resistance group that was later called the Red Orchestra (Rote Kapelle) by the Abwehr. Guddorf was the editor of the Marxist-Communist Die Rote Fahne (The Red Flag) newspaper.

Life
Wilhelm Guddorf came from a middle-class Catholic family. His father, Ludwig Guddorf, taught German, literature, and Greek at the Maison de Melle educational institution in Melle, Belgium for 29 years. In 1899 he became a professor at the commercial college there. At the beginning of World War I, the family was expelled from the country as Reich Germans. They moved to Haselünne with five children without possessions. There Ludwig Guddorf found employment as a teacher at the Lateinschule (secondary school).

Wilhelm Guddorf, the eldest son of the family, attended the Latin School in Haselünne from 1915 to 1917, then the Royal Grammar School in Meppen and dropped out of school in the 12th grade because he had fallen out with his parents because of his "religious and moral views". The highly gifted student worked temporarily as a tutor on an estate in West Prussia. Nevertheless, he passed his school-leaving examination in Meppen in 1921 and began studying philology, philosophy, history, literary history and musicology in Münster. He later mastered all the major European and Slavic languages, plus Arabic, Latin, Greek and Hebrew.

In 1922 he joined the Communist Party of Germany (KPD). He worked for several communist newspapers and translated the foreign press for them. In autumn 1923, he was arrested for "preparation for high treason" and "violation of the Republic Protection Law". In November 1923 he managed to escape from the Sennestadt protective custody camp. In May 1926 he was caught, served a prison sentence and was released in August 1927.

From 1923 he lived under the name Paul Braun. He also used this pseudonym to sign the articles he wrote, first for the KPD newspaper Freiheit in Düsseldorf, and from 1926-1933 for the official KPD party organ Rote Fahne - latterly as editor-in-chief of foreign affairs.

From 1933, using his pseudonym, he distributed illegal writings against the Nazi regime and was a member of the KPD district leadership of Berlin-Brandenburg. In April 1934 he was arrested and sentenced to three years in prison (in Luckau) for preparing for high treason. He was then placed in protective custody for two more years in Sachsenhausen concentration camp.

After he was released from Sachsenhausen, Guddorf developed contacts with members of a Berlin based anti-fascist group that was later called the Red Orchestra ("Rote Kapelle").

He was arrested once again in 1942 and in February 1943 was sentenced to death. He was executed at Plötzensee Prison in Berlin on 13 May 1943. In 1972, a street in Lichtenberg, a Berlin borough, was named after Guddorf.

Leafletting
Guddorf was known to have written some of the Agis leaflets. The leaflets were produced by the Harnack and Schulze-Boysen Groups and had names like What is a Majority, Freedom and Violence and Call to the workers of the mind and fist not to fight against Russia. The Agis was a reference to the Spartan King Agis IV. The leaflets were distributed in Berlin and Germany.

Arrest
Guddorf was arrested on 20 October 1942. Guddorf revealed his communist activities in Hamburg, that lead to the arrest of some 85 people in the North Sea dockyards.

Award and honours
 In 1972, the Berlin district of Lichtenberg named a street after Guddorf. The street is known as Wilhelm-Guddorf-Straße. The street is one of many that were renamed to honour the Rote Kapelle members e.g. Mildred-Harnack-Straße, Schulze-Boysen-Straße.
 In 1971, in the Berlin district of Köpenick a school in Rahnsdorf was renamed to Wilhelm Guddorf High School, Wilhelm-Guddorf-Oberschule The name remained in place until the Socialist Unity Party of Germany was dissolved and the German reunification commenced and by 1992 the parents, teachers and students decided to rename the school to Elementary School on the Püttbergen.

Literature

References

External links
  Wilhelm-Guddorf-Straße

1902 births
1943 deaths
Writers from Ghent
20th-century Belgian journalists
Male journalists
Communist Party of Germany politicians
Red Orchestra (espionage)
Belgian resistance members
Executed communists in the German Resistance
People condemned by Nazi courts
Executions at Plötzensee Prison
German spies for the Soviet Union
Executed spies
Sachsenhausen concentration camp prisoners
Belgian people executed by Nazi Germany